Golm could refer to:

 Golm (Potsdam)
 Golm, Austria
 Golm (Groß Miltzow)
 Golm (Zichow)
 Alt Golm
 Neu Golm
 Golm (Usedom)
 Golm Metabolome Database